Benedict is a small, bowl-shaped crater that lies on the floor of the walled basin Mendeleev. It is located near the lunar equator on the far side of the Moon from the Earth.

This crater is circular in shape, with little appearance of wear. At the midpoint of the sloping inner walls is a small central floor. The higher albedo of the inner walls, compared to the surrounding terrain, indicates that this is a relatively young formation.

References

 
 
 
 
 
 
 
 
 
 
 
 

Impact craters on the Moon